Ronan Thomas Darcy (born 4 November 2000) is an English professional footballer who plays for EFL League Two club Swindon Town.

Career

Bolton Wanderers 
Darcy signed for the Bolton Wanderers Academy in 2008 at the age of 9. He spent the first half of the 2018–2019 season on loan at Skelmersdale United, where he played three times.

On 5 May 2019, Darcy made his Bolton debut, coming on as a second half substitute for Craig Noone in Bolton's final game of the 2018–19 season away to Nottingham Forest. Darcy's scholarship contract was extended for a further year on 21 May 2019. He scored his first goal for Bolton Wanderers in a 5–2 defeat to Rochdale in the EFL Cup, and scored his first league goal for the club in a 5-1 defeat to Lincoln City. He played 22 matches during the 2019–20 season, which saw Bolton relegated to League Two. On 15 June 2020 Darcy signed his first professional contract, signing a new two year contract with Bolton. During the 2020–21 season he played 11 matches as Bolton were promoted to League One.

On 17 August 2021, he signed a new one year contract extension until 2023 and while it was initially reported that he had simultaneously joined Norwegian side Sogndal on loan until December, it wasn't until 27 August that the club confirmed the loan. The delay was due to work permit issues as Sogndal had not realised they had to apply for one, with English players no longer counting as EU players as a result of Brexit. His debut was delayed due to injury with Darcy making his debut on 22 September when he came on as a half time substitute in a 0–2 defeat against Åsane Fotball in the Norwegian Football Cup. Darcy helped Sogndal qualify for the play-offs, though they were eliminated in the first round by KFUM-Kameratene Oslo. 

On 1 February 2022, Darcy joined Scottish League One club Queen's Park on loan until the end of the season. He made his debut four days later when he came on as a substitute in a 1–1 draw against Falkirk. Darcy scored his first goal on 22 February in a 3–3 draw against Celtic U-20s in the Glasgow Cup. His first league goal for Queen's Park came on 12 March, a late equaliser in a 1–1 draw against Alloa Athletic. During his loan spell he helped Queen's Park reach the finals of both the Glasgow Cup and the play-offs. Though they lost the Glasgow Cup final 3–1 to Rangers B, they won the play-off final 3–2 on aggregate against Airdrieonians earning them promotion to the Scottish Championship.

Swindon Town 
On 13 July 2022, Darcy signed a two-year deal for EFL League Two side Swindon Town for an undisclosed fee, after completing a successful trial period at the club. He then scored his first goal for the Robins on 24 September, in a 1-2 away league victory against Grimsby Town.

Career statistics

Notes

Honours
Bolton Wanderers
EFL League Two third-place (promotion): 2020–21

Queen's Park
Scottish League One promotion play-offs: 2022
Glasgow Cup runner-up: 2021-22

References

English footballers
2000 births
Living people
People from Ormskirk
Association football midfielders
Bolton Wanderers F.C. players
Skelmersdale United F.C. players
Sogndal Fotball players
Queen's Park F.C. players
Swindon Town F.C. players
Northern Premier League players
English Football League players
Norwegian First Division players
Norwegian Fourth Division players
Scottish Professional Football League players
English expatriate footballers
Expatriate footballers in Norway
English expatriate sportspeople in Norway